Ticonderoga National Bank is a historic bank building located at Ticonderoga in Essex County, New York.  It was built between 1927 and 1929 and is a two-story, three by seven bay, trapezoidal granite building in the Renaissance Revival style.  It features a monumental arcade, large round arched windows, and a massive banking hall.

It was listed on the National Register of Historic Places in 1988.

References

Bank buildings on the National Register of Historic Places in New York (state)
Renaissance Revival architecture in New York (state)
Commercial buildings completed in 1929
Buildings and structures in Essex County, New York
National Register of Historic Places in Essex County, New York